Gijhi is a village panchayat located in the Rohtak district of the Indian state of Haryana. The old name of Gijhi is Girja Kheda founded in 816 AD . Name is changed to Gijhi from Girja Kheda in 1102 AD.  It is one of the oldest villages nearby and ancestor of the villages of Ismaila 11B, Ismaila 9B, Dattaur, Bhashru Kalan. It is 23.5 km away from district headquarters.

State capitol Chandigarh is around 261 kilometers from Gijhi.

Geography 

Nearby villages are Dattaur 1.0 km, Atail 3.5 km, Ismaila - 9B 4.2 km, Ismaila - 11B 3.4 km, Kheri Sampla 4.0 km, Sampla 3.2 km, Samchana 4.5 km, Bhaisru Kalan 4.6 km, Gandhra 4.8 km, Kisranti 5.2 km, Garhi Sampla 6.2 km, Hasangarh 8.8 km, Pakasma 8.9 km, Nonand 8.3 km, Kharawar 13.5 km, Kultana 9.5 km, Baliyana 19.2 km, Kheri Sadh 17.8 km

Language 
The native languages of Gijhi are Hindi, Punjabi, Haryanvi.

Transport 
The nearest railway station is Sampla, around 3 kilometers away.

Rail

Air 
Gijhi's nearest airport is Indira Gandhi Domestic Airport situated at 59.5 km distance. Few more airports around Gijhi are as follows.

Nearby centers 
Gijhi's nearest town/city/important place is Sampla, 3.5 kilometer away.

Education

References 

Villages in Rohtak district